Cyrtodactylus ngati is a species of gecko that is endemic to Vietnam.

References

Cyrtodactylus
Reptiles described in 2021
Taxa named by Larry Lee Grismer
Taxa named by Truong Quang Nguyen
Taxa named by Minh Le (herpetologist)
Taxa named by Thomas Ziegler (zoologist)